In the sport of cricket, a Man of the Match or Player of the Match award is given to the outstanding player, almost always the one who makes the most impact, in a match, The term was originally used in cricket before being adopted by other sports. The award can go to a player from either team, but it is usually the winning team.

In Test cricket, the man of the match award became a regular feature in the mid-1980s. It is usually awarded to the player whose contribution is seen as the most important in winning the game, but there have been many instances of a player on the losing team receiving the award. 

In Test matches, Jacques Kallis holds the record for the highest number of awards, with 23 in 166 matches, followed by Muttiah Muralitharan with 19 awards.

In ODI matches Sachin Tendulkar holds the record for the highest number of man of the match awards, with 62 in 463 matches. Sanath Jayasuriya is second with 48.

In Twenty20 Internationals, Virat Kohli leads with 15 awards.

Test cricket
Note: Players in bold are still active in international cricket.

Most Player of the Match awards

Most Player of the Series awards

One Day International cricket
Note: Players in bold are still active in international cricket.

Most Player of the Match awards

Most Player of the Series awards

Twenty20 International cricket
Note: Players in bold are still active in international cricket.

Most Player of the Match awards

Most Player of the Series awards

All formats
Note: Players in bold are still active in international cricket.

Most Player of the Match awards

Most Player of the Series awards

Shared awards
Occasionally in international cricket awards are shared, sometimes between two players of the same side or players of both sides. On these occasions, the commentators and other awarding authorities held on to share the awards, without giving the award to a player of the winning team. In Test cricket there have been rare instances when a joint award for man of the match or man of the series has been announced. However, in ODIs and Twenty20 internationals this is usually when a member of the losing team is the highest scorer, such as when Charles Coventry (194) and Tamim Iqbal (154) shared the award after Zimbabwe lost the match. In another interesting match held on 3 April 1996, the whole New Zealand team was awarded the Man of the Match award by adjudicator Basil Butcher who pronounced it a team performance. It was the first time that a whole team had been given the Man of the Match award.

There have been only three occasions, one in test cricket and two in ODI cricket, when the whole team has been awarded the man of the match by considering the team performance rather than individual performances.

Team Man of the Match awards
In Test cricket, South Africa has been awarded Team man of the match award, in the West Indies tour in 1998/99 season. The match was won by South Africa by 351 runs and whole 11 players awarded the man of the match award.

In ODI cricket, New Zealand team has been awarded man of the match award for their team performances to 4 run victory against the West Indies on 3 April 1996. On 1 September 1996, Pakistan team has been awarded man of the match for their team performance against England for their 2 wicket win.

Joint awards in Tests
Joint awards are sometimes given to two players, either from the same team or one from each team. As of 2017, there have been 14 instances where two players from the same team were given the Man of the Match award in Test cricket.

Until 2017, there have been 26 instances where one player from each team was given the Man of the Match award in Test cricket.

There was one rare instance where three players were given the man of the match award in Test cricket. This happened between New Zealand and Sri Lanka in February 1991 at Hamilton.  

In one occasion in international cricket, man of the match was given to a non-player, specifically to the ground staff. In the third Test match between South Africa and New Zealand on 8 December 2000 at Johannesburg, the fifth day was delayed due to rain. However, with the help of the ground staff, managed by Chris Scott, the Head Groundsman, the play continued and the match ended in a draw.

Joint awards in One Day Internationals
As of 2020, there have been 18 instances where two players from the same team were given the Man of the Match award in ODI cricket.

Until 2018, there have been 14 instances where one player from each team was given the Man of the Match awards in ODI cricket.

References

Cricket awards and rankings